Alexis Brandeker (born May 18, 1974) is a Swedish astronomer at the Stockholm Observatory and discoverer of minor planets.

In 2003 he acquired his Ph.D. (on Young stars and circumstellar disks) from the Stockholm Observatory. He went on to become a post-doctoral fellow at the University of Toronto for 2.5 years before returning to Stockholm in 2007, where he now works as a research associate at the Stockholm Observatory. He is credited by the Minor Planet Center with the discovery of 4 minor planets in 2000.

References

Publications

External links 
 Personal home page

1974 births
Discoverers of asteroids

Living people
21st-century Swedish astronomers